Paolo Altomonte Abrera (born February 24, 1971, Muntinlupa, Philippines) is a Filipino television host, lifestyle columnist, triathlete, and environmentalist. He is the youngest child of Carlos Abrera and Emily Altomonte-Abrera from Muntinlupa.

He is the creative director of Tripleshot Media Inc, a Manila-based independent production company that create English-language non-fiction lifestyle and entertainment content for free-TV, cable, and web channels. He is a practitioner of multi-disciplinary creative arts having graduated from the University of Western Sydney with a focus on visual arts and a New York University film-making course. Alongside his career in broadcasting, Paolo has also had stints as a commercials director and television content producer.

In 2020, Abrera became an anchor for New Day on CNN Philippines. He formerly hosted the morning show Mornings @ ANC in ANC, and formerly hosted the sustainable lifestyle show Green Living, the auto show Rev and the health-lifestyle show Health Matters, previously worked under GMA News via Q Channel 11 show like May Trabaho Ka (later Hired) before the channel's re-brand to GMA News TV.

Abrera is married to prominent television host Suzi Entrata. They first met on the sports show Game Plan, a multi-awarded sports magazine show where they were both hosts independently produced by Probe Productions Inc. back then. Over time, their mutual attraction developed into a relationship. On May 6, 2001, they married at Colegio San Agustin Chapel in Makati. They have 3 daughters: Leona Abrera, Jade Abrera and Antonella Abrera.

References

1971 births
Living people
De La Salle University alumni
People from Muntinlupa
Filipino broadcasters
Filipino columnists
Filipino environmentalists
Filipino television presenters
Filipino male triathletes
Western Sydney University alumni
ABS-CBN personalities
ABS-CBN News and Current Affairs people
CNN people
GMA Network personalities
GMA Integrated News and Public Affairs people
Viva Artists Agency